Binačka Morava (Macedonian and Serbian Cyrillic: Биначка Морава;  or Mirusha) is a river which flows in southeastern Kosovo and North Macedonia.  It flows generally in the southwest to northeast direction, from Macedonian border to Bujanovac, where, after 49 km, meets Preševska Moravica, to create South Morava.

Sources 
The river begins in the mountain of Skopska Crna Gora, in North Macedonia, north of its capital Skopje. Streams of Ključevska reka and Slatinska reka join together to form the river Golema, which is, after passing the Macedonian-Serbian border, known as Binačka Morava.

Annotations

References

Rivers of Serbia
Rivers of Kosovo
Rivers of North Macedonia